Our Italian Husband (also called Rent-a-Husband or Mariti in affitto) is a 2004 romantic comedy starring Brooke Shields, Maria Grazia Cucinotta, Chevy Chase, and Pierfrancesco Favino written and directed by Ilaria Borrelli.

It's a story of an Italian woman who flies to New York City in search of her husband and discovers him married to an American wife.

Cast
 Maria Grazia Cucinotta as Maria Scocozza
 Pierfrancesco Favino as Vincenzo Scocozza
 Brooke Shields as Charlene Taylor
 Chevy Chase as Paul Parmesan
 Diego Serrano as Raul
 Franco Javarone as Don Peppino
 James Falzone as Ciro Scocozza
 Lauren Martin as Lucetta Scocozza
 Jillian Stacom as Bibi Taylor
 John Tormey as Gaetano
 Jennifer Macaluso as Irina
 Ray Iannicelli as Luca

References

External links
 

2004 romantic comedy films
Films set in Italy
Films set in the United States
2004 films
English-language Italian films
2000s English-language films